Amandawe also known as Amandawe Mission, or often informally abbreviated as A.M.A or A.M is a small township located at KwaZulu-Natal South Coast region of South Africa, the area is mostly populated with Black Africans.

History
Amandawe was a sugarcane farm before developing to a township. An ethnobotanical survey was conducted in the area by Ben-Erik van Wyk and showed that the use of medicinal plants has remained popular for historical and ancestral reasons thus the town is named for Ancestry.On 19 May 2018, about 1500 people blocked the P188 road with rocks, trees, and burning tires due to the abandonment of the township by Umdoni Local Municipality.

Etymology
Amandawe is a Zulu word relating to the ancestors, because of the community's belief to ancestors.

Demography

The population of Amandawe, as recorded in the 2011 census, was 11,343 people living in 2,469 households.

Religion
The township has different religions, namely:
 Apostolic Faith Mission of South Africa 
 Assemblies of God
 Roman Catholic Church
 Zion Christian Church

Geography

Climate

Location

The township is surrounded by neighboring populated areas such as Amahlongwa, Dududu, Freeland Park, KwaCele, Park Rynie, Renishaw Hills, Scottburgh.

Wildlife
Different plant species are located all over the township. It also has a river named after it called Amandawe River. The township people generally use the plant species in the area to make medicine (muti) to help others or themselves.

The township is known for a number of creatures like brown house snakes, black mambas, spotted bush snakes, indian mynas and the hadada ibis which is used as an alarm in the morning, but in the township it is said that it brings bad luck. 

The vervet monkeys are often cited as pests due to stealing food.

Media

Radio
Umdoni Community Radio also known as UCR is a nonprofit radio station based at the township.  Other famous radio stations such as East Coast Radio, Metro FM, Ukhozi FM can are also listened to due to having a lager media coverage.

Newspaper
Due to the townships location (KwaZulu-Natal South Coast) newspaper coverage includes South Coast Sun,  South Coast Herald, South Coast Fever, Mid South Coast Rising Sun.

Sports

Amandawe is a sport active township mainly on football (Amandawe F.C), netball, and other sports. Most sporting events in the area takes place at Amandawe Sport Ground. The Amandawe League invites teams outside the township to compete in the league such as Alaska F.C, Scottburgh F.C (The Amigos), Pholas F.C, New Age F.C, etc.

Economy
The economy of the township is still thriving through the small local businesses in the area. The citizens depend on the neighboring towns, Scottburgh, Umzinto and Umkomaas for water and sanitation, health, police, and other services, because infrastructural development in the township is very slow.

Retail
Retail service in the township includes retail stores such as:
 Boxer Punch (defunct)  
 Boxer Build (defunct) 
 Amandawe Mini Market
 Amandawe Hardware 
 Amandawe Trading Store 
 Amandawe Liquor 
 And small Foreign shops all around the township

Transport

Road 
The P188 also known as Dududu Rd runs through the township from Freeland Park to western central of Amandawe, it has a length of 3.98 km. The road connects the R102 and P197-3.

The N2 bypasses under the bridge of P188. Access to the township from N2 can be acquired from the P188 Interchange (Exit 110).

The P197-3 passes through the township providing access to Amahlongwa when turning right, it also provides access to Dududu and Umzinto when turning left.

Air

Education
The township has 3 school and a number of pre-schools, such as :
 Amagcino Crèche 
 Amandawe Junior Primary
 Amandawe Youth Care Centre
 Amahlashana Senior Primary
 Edwaleni Care Center
 Gugulesizwe High School

Crime and safety
Murder rate in the township is at its peak as taxi wars, rape, gang wars, and burglaries keep on escalating.

Wars often occur within the township due to different divisions in the township and also other neighboring areas, where these wars date back to the 1960's during the South African Border War

Notable people
 Maseru Madlala - an entrepreneur.
 Marcia Mandisi Mabaso - a Radio personality.

See also
KwaZulu-Natal South Coast
Umdoni Local Municipality

References

KwaZulu-Natal South Coast
Populated places in the Umdoni Local Municipality
Townships in KwaZulu-Natal

External links